Grzymała may refer to:

Grzymała (surname)
Grzymała, Pomeranian Voivodeship (north Poland)
Grzymała, Świętokrzyskie Voivodeship (south Poland)
Grzymała coat-of-arms

See also